Chaghal (also Romanized as Choghal; also known as Chūghal) is a village in Rak Rural District, in the Central District of Kohgiluyeh County, Kohgiluyeh and Boyer-Ahmad Province, Iran. At the 2006 census, its population was 285, in 52 families.

References 

Populated places in Kohgiluyeh County